Dargahi Shah is a village in Jhang District in the Punjab province of Pakistan. It is located at 31°7'0N 72°2'60E with an altitude of 148 metres (488 feet).

References

Populated places in Jhang District
Jhang District